Wakamiya Inari Shrine at Waipahu Cultural Garden in Waipahu, Hawaii, is the last surviving example of Inari Shrine architecture on Oahu. Unlike most Shinto shrines, which are unpainted, those dedicated to the fox deity Inari, the god of the harvest, are painted bright red. This shrine thus represents not just the religious heritage of Japanese immigrants to Hawaii, but also their principal early roles as agricultural laborers on sugarcane and pineapple plantations. It was added to the National Register of Historic Places on 8 January 1980.

The simple wood frame building measures 19 by 26 feet, with wooden steps leading up to a raised floor with a balustraded verandah that wraps around the sanctuary. Long eaves of the irimoya (hip-and-gable) roof extend over both the front steps and the verandah. The sanctuary is enclosed by sliding doors with latticework tops and contains an inner altar behind a bell rope and a box for offerings. The building has been carefully restored but still lacks the chigi (forked finials) above the ornamental ridgepole.

The shrine was founded by Reverend Yoshio Akizaki, a Shinto priest who had studied in Tokyo in 1912. Originally built in 1914 in Honolulu's industrial area of Kakaako by a Japanese architect known only as Haschun, it was relocated in 1918 to 2132 South King Street in Moiliili, the heart of the city's Japanese community. After the death of the founder in 1951, his son Takeo inherited both the property and the priesthood. After Takeo's death, the property was sold and the shrine was relocated to Waipahu Cultural Garden in 1979 to make way for a sporting goods store.

The relocated shrine is in a rural rather than urban setting and the surrounding garden lacks several of its original elements, including its water purification basin (chōzuya or temizuya), its paired stone images of guardian lions and fox deities, and its original torii, although a new torii has been reconstructed at the new site. For its 100th anniversary in 2014, it received a new roof and won a Historic Preservation Honor Award.

Gallery

References

External links

 Official site
 Hawaii State Info: Waipahu, Honolulu County, Hawaii 

Japanese-American culture in Hawaii
Properties of religious function on the National Register of Historic Places in Hawaii
Shinto shrines in the United States
Hawaiian architecture
Religious buildings and structures in Honolulu
National Register of Historic Places in Honolulu
Inari shrines
Religious buildings and structures completed in 1914
1914 establishments in Hawaii
20th-century Shinto shrines